Fernando Brandolini (4 January 1932 – 27 July 1987) was an Italian professional racing cyclist. He rode in the 1960 Tour de France.

References

External links
 

1932 births
1987 deaths
Italian male cyclists
Cyclists from the Metropolitan City of Milan